Jabal Kumar is a mountain located in Iraq.

References
https://web.archive.org/web/20101027185129/http://earthsearch.net/featureIndex.php?type=int&start=2581000&end=2582000
https://web.archive.org/web/20070628234601/http://plasma.nationalgeographic.com/mapmachine/

Mountains of Iraq